Ringless voicemail, also called a voicemail drop, is a method in which a pre-recorded audio message is placed in a voicemail inbox without the associated telephone ringing first. This practice is commonly associated with spamming and debt collection services.

Legal status in the United States 
Although the Federal Communications Commission was petitioned to exempt the practice from robocall laws, the petition was dropped after it raised controversy. 

United States courts have consistently ruled multiple times that voicemail is subject to the Telephone Consumer Protection Act the same as a regular telephone call, which has the effect of making voicemail drops that contain an unsolicited advertisement or debt collection calls illegal in all circumstances where the recipient phone number belongs to a rate limited account. Such messages, therefore, are a violation subject to fines and civil liability, even if the call went unanswered or the voice message wasn't opened, and the person called does not need to prove that they were billed for any calls to win the case. Such messages are also illegal in cases where the phone number is listed on the FTC's do not call list.

Legal status in Canada 
In Canada, the CRTC allows voice mail messages that do not interrupt the person's activities in real-time.

References

Spamming
Telemarketing
Voicemail